Eusynthemis brevistyla is a species of dragonfly of the family Synthemistidae,
known as a small tigertail. 
It is a medium-sized dragonfly with black and yellow markings.
It inhabits streams in south-eastern Australia

Gallery

See also
 List of Odonata species of Australia

References

Synthemistidae
Odonata of Australia
Insects of Australia
Endemic fauna of Australia
Taxa named by Edmond de Sélys Longchamps
Insects described in 1871